Veijo Viinikka (born 27 March 1966) is a Finnish professional darts player.

He competed in the 2011 PDC World Darts Championship, losing 4–2 to Roland Scholten in the preliminary round. He made his European Tour debut for German Darts Championship, but he lost to David Pallett in the first round. He made his PDC World Cup debut for Finland in 2020, but he and Marko Kantele lost to Germany 0–5.

World Championship performances

PDC 
 2011: Preliminary round (lost to Roland Scholten 2–4) (legs)

References

External links 
Veijo Viinikka's Stats at Darts Database

Finnish darts players
Living people
Professional Darts Corporation associate players
1966 births
PDC World Cup of Darts Finnish team
Sportspeople from Espoo